My Depression may refer to:

My Depression: A Picture Book, a 2005 picture book by Elizabeth Swados
My Depression (The Up and Down and Up of It), a 2014 animated short film based on Swados' book